In the Book of Mormon, Laman and Lemuel are the two eldest sons of Lehi and the older brothers of Sam, Nephi, Jacob, and Joseph. According to the text, they lived around 600 BC. They were notable for their rebellion against Lehi and Nephi, becoming the primary antagonists of the First and Second Books of Nephi. Their descendants became known as the Lamanites and Lemuelites, while the descendants of Nephi and their other brothers became the Nephites.

Laman was Lehi's first-born son. He rejected the teachings of his father (in particular Lehi's prophecy of the forthcoming destruction of Jerusalem in 600 BC). He and Lemuel persecuted and beat their brothers Sam and Nephi, who supported Lehi. Because God chose Nephi to lead Lehi's descendants after his death, Laman maintained that he had been robbed of his birthright, resulting in constant wars between the two peoples for nearly 600 years.

Divine Interventions
In the Book of Mormon there are incidences of Laman and Lemuel beating or binding up Nephi. On the first occurrence, when they were beating Nephi and Sam with a rod, an angel visited the brothers and rebuked Laman and Lemuel. On other occasions, Laman and Lemuel were chastened by the voice of the Lord, or "shocked" by divine power.

River of Laman and Valley of Lemuel
In , Lehi's party makes its way from Jerusalem towards the promised land. Verse 5 says that Lehi  "came down by the borders near the shore of the Red Sea; and he traveled in the wilderness in the borders which are nearer the Red Sea." The group traveled for three more days after they had reached "the borders near the shore of the Red Sea" before making camp. At this point, they make camp "in a valley by the side of a river of water." Verses 8-10 read:

Hugh Nibley, an LDS scholar and apologist, thought this area referred to as "the borders" was by Jabal al-Lawz  ((), also known as Gebel el-Lawz), a mountain sometimes identified with Mount Sinai although most people reject this classification.

Etymology
"Lemuel" (Hebrew:לְמוּאֵל) is the name of a Biblical king mentioned in Proverbs 31, but otherwise unknown. In verse 4, it says, "Give not to kings, O Lemuel, give not wine to kings ..." The discourse, which is an exhortation to chastity and temperance, appears to end with verse 9, but might continue through the end of the chapter.

Hugh Nibley remarks Lemuel has a "good pure Arabic name, incidentally."

Family

References

Further reading

See also
 Lamanites
 Lemuelites

Book of Mormon people
Book of Mormon words and phrases
Sibling duos
Angelic visionaries